The 1931 UK & Ireland Greyhound Racing Year was the sixth year of greyhound racing in the United Kingdom and Ireland. The total annual attendance across the country for 1931 increased to 17,906,917 from 17,119,120 (in 1930), a fifth consecutive annual increase.

Summary
Mick the Miller was a now household name in the United Kingdom following his achievement in winning a second English Greyhound Derby. A third Derby win was the primary target for the year but before the event started he successfully defended his Wembley Spring Cup title during March. He won heat and semi final before claiming the final on 23 March in a track record time of 30.04. After three more races he then participated in the 1931 English Greyhound Derby. The exploits of Mick the Miller was propelling many other greyhounds to national fame at the time. He retired on a high with an undefeated run to St Leger glory. The final opposition had included Virile Lad, the brilliant bitch Bradshaw Fold and the Derby champion Seldom Led. He was retired to stud with Jack Masters in Norfolk and later starred in a film called Wild Boy produced by Gainsborough Pictures, along with stars of the day, Sonnie Hale, Bud Flanagan and Chesney Allen.

Tracks
At least 17 new tracks opened during 1931, including a new stadium on the Park Royal site in London. The Associated Greyhound Company that owned the tracks of Towneley and Darnall and the lease at Craven Park went bankrupt. Towneley was then bought by Captain Ramsbottom.

The Duchy of Cornwall proposed allowing greyhound racing to take place at The Oval, to generate income for the Kennington area, the proposal failed following protests from neighbours and Christian groups.

Ireland
Following a meeting by the Irish Coursing Club on 4 August, the idea of a major racing calendar schedule was discussed and circulated to the Irish tracks. The Kilkenny dog Little Chummie completed a significant double by winning the National Cup at Shelbourne Park and the unofficial 1931 Irish Greyhound Derby at Harold's Cross Stadium.

Competitions
A greyhound called Future Cutlet arrived on the scene, sired by Mutton Cutlet he had come over from Ireland after being purchased for £600 by W.A. Evershed to race at Wembley Stadium. He was trained by Sidney Probert and was then entered for the 1931 Cesarewitch at West Ham Stadium. He set a new national record for the 600 yards in the heats before winning the event. Mick the Miller finished runner-up.

Altamatzin won the Welsh Greyhound Derby before defeating Mick the Miller in a match race on 15 August, at the Welsh White City. Future Cutlet secured a second major trophy by virtue of winning the Laurels at Wimbledon. Another greyhound that had appeared during the year was a brindle dog called Wild Woolley, the April 1930 whelp, came to prominence when winning the Trafalgar Puppy Cup.

Bradshaw Fold confirmed her status as the leading bitch by reaching a third consecutive Oaks final but a third-place finish meant that she would retire with only a Coronation Stakes to her name.

News
The Greyhound Racing Association's (GRA) Hook Estate and Kennels at Northaw opened.

Tracks opened

Roll of honour

+ unofficial National Derby

Principal UK races

Principal Irish finals

Key
U = unplaced

References 

Greyhound racing in the United Kingdom
Greyhound racing in the Republic of Ireland
1931 in British sport
1931 in Irish sport
1931 in Welsh sport
1931 in Scottish sport